Dilemma Geyser is a geyser in the Lower Geyser Basin of Yellowstone National Park in the United States. It is part of the Pink Cone complex. Other geysers in this group are Bead Geyser, Box Spring, Labial Geyser, Labial's Satellite Geyser, Narcissus Geyser, Pink Geyser, and Pink Cone Geyser.

Eruptions of Dilemma Geyser are rare. Intervals (= eruption start to eruption start) are 2 to 10 minutes.

Before 1989, this geyser had tiny eruptions, with a few water drops reaching above grass level.  However, the two vents are surrounded by developed runoff channels.  The inadequacy of the observed eruption water volumes to produce the channels was the inspiration for the name "Dilemma Geyser".  In 1989, more forceful eruptions occurred, with water runoff volumes sufficient to explain the channels.

Dilemma was active in 1992 and sporadically in the 2000s.  It has not been reported erupting since 2006.

The RCN location of this geyser has been unintentionally switched with A-0 Geyser, elsewhere in the Lower Geyser Basin.

References

Geysers of Wyoming
Geothermal features of Teton County, Wyoming
Geothermal features of Yellowstone National Park
Geysers of Teton County, Wyoming